Elisabeth Grossmann is an Austrian politician of Social Democratic Party of Austria. She was the member of National Council from 2002 to September 2009 and was re-elected in 2013.

References

External links
  (in German)

1968 births
Living people
Social Democratic Party of Austria politicians
Politicians from Graz
University of Graz alumni